Mount Neuner is a mountain 3.5 nautical miles (6 km) southwest of Mount Chandler, in the Behrendt Mountains, Palmer Land. Mapped by United States Geological Survey (USGS) from surveys and U.S. Navy air photos, 1961–67. Named by Advisory Committee on Antarctic Names (US-ACAN) for Charles S. Neuner, station engineer at Camp Sky-Hi, summer 1961–62.

Mountains of Palmer Land